Liliana Ayalde (born March 1956) is the former United States Ambassador to Brazil and was previously the Deputy Assistant Secretary (DAS) for the United States State Department with responsibility for the Offices of Caribbean Affairs, Central American Affairs and Cuban Affairs. From January 2017 to September 2019 she served as the Civilian Deputy to the Commander and Foreign Policy Advisor for the United States Southern Command.

Education
Ayalde earned a Bachelor of Arts degree from the School of International Service at American University and a Master's in Public Health from Tulane University.

Career

From 2008 to 2011, Liliana Ayalde was the U.S. Ambassador to Asuncion, Paraguay. She arrived in Paraguay June 2008. She had previously served with USAID.

On July 16, 2012, the Department of State announced her promotion to Deputy Assistant Secretary in the State Department's Western Hemisphere (WHA) Bureau, responsible for the Offices of Caribbean Affairs, Central American Affairs and Cuban Affairs.

During her assignment as a Deputy Assistant Administrator, Ambassador Ayalde testified before the U.S. Senate Subcommittee on the Western Hemisphere, Peace Corps, and Global Narcotics Affairs.

From a 2008 State Department bio:

On August 1, 2013, the U.S. Senate confirmed Liliana Ayalde's nomination to be the U.S. Ambassador to the Federative Republic of Brazil. She presented her credentials on October 31, 2013, and served until January 3, 2017. In June 2016, P. Michael McKinley was nominated to succeed Ayalde as U.S. Ambassador to Brazil. He was confirmed by the U.S. Senate on September 8, 2016, and formally replaced Ayalde on January 11, 2017.

References

External links

|-

1956 births
American University School of International Service alumni
Living people
People from Baltimore
Tulane University School of Public Health and Tropical Medicine alumni
Ambassadors of the United States to Paraguay
Ambassadors of the United States to Brazil
American women ambassadors
21st-century American women